is a university with several branches in Japan, including Hakusan, Asaka, Kawagoe, Itakura, and Akabane.

Overview 
Inoue felt that the subject of philosophy was neglected in Japanese schools of higher learning at the time. In 1906, the school was moved to its present site (Hakusan Campus) and its name was changed to Toyo University. The school's motto was "Protection of Country and Love of Truth"(護國愛理).

Originally, courses were offered in philosophy, religion, ethics, education, Japanese, and classical Chinese, and the school continued to expand over time. In 1949, there was a substantial restructuring of the university, and faculties of Literature, Economics, Law, Sociology, Engineering and Business Administration were established. Each of these faculties has a graduate program. Faculties of Regional Development Studies and Life Sciences were added in April, 1997. A law school was created in April 2004, and the Kawagoe campus hosts a Bio-Nano Electronics Research Centre founded in 2003. Among those conducting research at this facility was Nobel Laureate Sir Harold Kroto (7 October 1939 – 30 April 2016). Toyo University  consists of eleven graduate schools, one postgraduate law faculty, eleven undergraduate faculties, forty four departments, various research institutes, and five affiliated high schools, serving a combined student body of more than 30,000 students.

Campuses
 Hakusan Campus (5-28-20 Hakusan, Bunkyo-ku, Tokyo)
 Akabane Campus (1-7-12 Akabane, Kita-ku, Tokyo)
 Asaka Campus (48-1 Oka, Asaka-shi, Saitama)
 Kawagoe Campus (2100 Kujirai, Kawagoe-shi, Saitama)
 Itakura Campus (1-1-1 Izumino, Itakura-machi, Ora-gun, Gunma)
 Otemachi Satellite Campus (1F, New Otemachi Building, 2-2-1 Otemachi, Chiyoda-ku, Tokyo)
 Sports Center (92-1 Shimizu-cho, Itabashi-ku, Tokyo)

Organization

Faculties and Departments
 Faculty of Letters
 Department of Philosophy
 Department of Eastern Philosophy and Culture
 Department of Japanese Literature and Culture
 Department of English and American Literature
 Department of History
 Department of Education
 Department of International Culture and Communication Studies
 Faculty of Economics
 Department of Economics
 Department of International Economics
 Department of Policy Studies
 Faculty of Business Administration
 Department of Business Administration
 Department of Marketing
 Department of Accounting and Finance
 Faculty of Law
 Department of Law
 Department of Business Law
 Faculty of Sociology
 Department of Sociology
 Department of Sociocultural Studies
 Department of Social Welfare
 Department of Media and Communications
 Department of Social Psychology
 Faculty of Global and Regional
 Department of Global Innovation Studies
 Department of Regional Development Studies
 Faculty of International Tourism Management
 Department of International Tourism Management
 Faculty of Information Networking for Innovation and Design
 Faculty of Human Life Design
 Department of Human Care and Support
 Department of Health Care and Sports
 Department of Human Environment Design
 Faculty of Science and Engineering
 Department of Mechanical
 Department of Biomedical Engineering
 Department of Electrical, Electronic and Communications Engineering
 Department of Applied Chemistry
 Department of Civil and Environmental Engineering
 Department of Architecture
 Faculty of Information Sciences and Arts
 Faculty of Life Sciences
 Department of Life Sciences
 Department of Applied Biosciences
 Faculty of Food and Nutritional Sciences
 Department of Food and Life Sciences
 Department of Nutrition and Health Sciences

Rankings 
Toyo University is ranked within the top 73th in the Japan by the Times Higher Education World University Rankings 2022.

Japan University Rankings 
　THE(2022)　73

　QS  (2019)　71-75

Asian University Rankings 
　THE(2022)　501+

　QS  (2022)　401-450

World University Rankings 
　THE(2022)　1201+

See also
List of Toyo University people
List of universities in Japan

References

External links 

 

Educational institutions established in 1887
Private universities and colleges in Japan
Toyo University
1887 establishments in Japan
Universities and colleges in Tokyo